Vanessa Menendez (née: De Roide Toledo born August 1, 1987, in Carolina) is a Puerto Rican TV host, model and beauty pageant titleholder who winner of Nuestra Belleza Latina 2012. She was the female image of Fox Deportes.

Miss Earth 2005
She represented Puerto Rico in Miss Earth 2005 and finished in the Top 8. She also won the Best in Long Gown Award. As of 2021, De Roide, Yeidy Bosques, Nellys Pimentel and Krystal Badillo are currently the only 4 delegates from Puerto Rico to place in the finals, with Bosques winning the title of Miss Earth-Fire 2010 (3rd Runner-Up), Pimentel crowned Miss Earth 2019 and Badillo placed Top 8 in 2020.

Miss Universe Puerto Rico 2012
She represented Carolina at Miss Universe Puerto Rico 2012, finishing as first runner-up.

Nuestra Belleza Latina 2012
Vanessa de Roide won the title of Nuestra Belleza Latina 2012 on May 20, 2012. In addition to the title, she won a one-year contract with the Spanish speaking Univision, $250,000 in cash and prizes, and making her the second Puerto Rican woman to obtain the title, after Melissa Marty in 2008, and appeared on the cover of Cosmopolitan en Español magazine in 2012.

Career
In May 2012, after winning Nuestra Belleza Latina, De Roide joined the Univision network where she made appearances on several TV shows including El Gordo y la Flaca, Sabado Gigante, Despierta America and Sal y Pimienta. She later became a backstage presenter on the third season of Mira Quien Baila. In May 2013, Univision renewed her contract and she joined Univision's longest running TV Show Sabado Gigante starring Don Francisco. She worked as a model on Sabado Gigante until the show's finale on September 19, 2015. In October 2015, De Roide joined her manager and friend Joe Ahmed to create a new talent search competition called Iconic Model Search where young aspiring models would compete for a chance to become a successful model and win several prizes.

See also
 Miss Puerto Rico 2012

References

External links
Miss Puerto Rico Official Website

1987 births
Living people
Miss Earth 2005 contestants
Puerto Rican beauty pageant winners
People from Carolina, Puerto Rico
Nuestra Belleza Latina winners